The list of shipwrecks in 1794 includes ships sunk, foundered, wrecked, grounded or otherwise lost during 1794.

January

22 January

23 January

24 January

25 January

27 January

Unknown date

February

8 February

12 February

18 February

Unknown date

March

15 March

29 March

Unknown date

April

13 April

29 April

30 April

Unknown date

May

8 May

21 May

Unknown date

June

1 June

26 June

28 June

Unknown date

July

1 July

10 July

21 July

Unknown date

August

8 August

12 August

17 August

23 August

24 August

28 August

Unknown date

September

2 September

3 September

6 September

19 September

24 September

Unknown date

October

1 October

4 October

5 October

8 October

10 October

11 October

20 October

23 October

24 October

Unknown date

November

4 November

5 November

11 November

18 November

20 November

21 November

25 November

26 November

28 November

Unknown date

December

6 December

7 December

8 December

16 December

21 December

23 December

24 December

27 December

28 December

Unknown date

Unknown date

References

1794